State Route 49 (SR 49) is a primary state highway in the U.S. state of Virginia.  The state highway runs  from the North Carolina state line in Virgilina, Virginia in Halifax County, where the highway continues south as North Carolina Highway 49 (NC 49), north to U.S. Route 360 (US 360) near Burkeville in Nottoway County.  SR 49 passes through Southside Virginia, connecting Virgilina and Burkeville with Clarksville and Chase City in Mecklenburg County, Victoria in Lunenburg County, and Crewe in Nottoway County.  Via US 360, the state highway connects Richmond with the John H. Kerr Reservoir.

Route description

SR 49 begins at the North Carolina state line in the town of Virgilina in southeastern Halifax County.  The state highway is concurrent with SR 96 on two-lane undivided Florence Avenue.  The two highways continue into North Carolina as NC 49 and NC 96, which then split and head toward Roxboro and Oxford, respectively.  The two highways cross over the old railroad grade of the Norfolk, Franklin and Danville Railway then intersect Seventh Street.  SR 96 turns west toward US 501, which leads to South Boston and Halifax, the county seat of Halifax County.  SR 49 turns east onto Seventh Street, leaving the town and becoming Clarksville Road, which closely parallels the state line for a short distance before veering northeast and entering Mecklenburg County after crossing Aarons Creek, which flows north into the Dan River.  The state highway passes through the hamlets of Nelson and Buffalo Junction before reaching US 58.

SR 49 joins US 58, a four-lane divided highway, in a concurrency to just west of Clarksville.  SR 49 heads northeast along Virginia Avenue, which also carried US 58 prior to the completion of US 58's Clarksville bypass.  Virginia Avenue is a four-lane divided highway from US 58 into the town of Clarksville until just after it passes under the Virginia Southern Railroad, where the highway reduces to a two-lane undivided road and intersects US 15 (College Avenue).  SR 49 and US 15 continue east concurrent into downtown Clarksville, where the highway passes through the Clarksville Historic District.  After passing through the downtown area, SR 49 and US 15 leave the town of Clarksville by crossing the John H. Kerr Reservoir, an impoundment of the Roanoke River that is also known as Buggs Island Lake, on the Phillip Saint Julian Wilson Bridge and a causeway.  The bridge, which contains lights underneath used for nighttime fishing, includes a brief passage through Halifax County due to the thalwegs of the Roanoke and Dan Rivers, which were used to set the county boundaries, converging just south of Clarksville.  At the east end of the causeway, access to US 58 is provided at a four-way intersection.  Ramps to US 58 west and US 58 east form the southern and eastern legs of the intersection, which mainline US 58 avoids via a pair of flyover ramps just east of its bridge over the reservoir.  SR 49 and US 15 turn north, cross over the Virginia Southern rail line, and parallel the eastern shore of the lake until the two highways split at the hamlet of Dortch Store.

SR 49 heads northeast, crossing Goodell Creek, Little Bluestone Creek, and Woodpecker Creek and passing through the hamlet of Jones Store before reaching Chase City.  Just inside the town limits, SR 49 joins SR 92 in a concurrency on Second Street while crossing Little Bluestone Creek again.  In the center of town, the two highways cross over the Virginia Southern rail line and intersect Main Street.  SR 92 heads south toward Boydton on Main Street, SR 47 heads east on Second Street toward South Hill, and SR 49 turns north onto Main Street to join SR 47 in a concurrency.  At the north end of town, SR 47 splits to the northwest while SR 49 veers northeast, where the highway crosses the Meherrin River on the Tucker Mill Bridge into Lunenburg County.  The state highway gains the name Courthouse Road, which it carries as it bridges the Middle Meherrin River and North Meherrin River and passes through the county seat of Lunenburg, where SR 40 (Lunenburg County Road) joins the highway in a concurrency northeast to the town of Victoria.  SR 49 and SR 40 enter the town as Court Street, crossing the former right-of-way of the Norfolk, Franklin and Danville Railway before reaching Main Street.  SR 40 turns south toward Kenbridge while SR 49 turns north then veers northeast onto Nottoway Boulevard.

SR 49 leaves Victoria as The Falls Road, named for the cataract where the state highway crosses the Nottoway River into Nottoway County.  The state highway is also named Earle Davis Gregory Highway, named for Earle Davis Gregory, a World War I Medal of Honor recipient.  At the river, SR 49 turns north, crossing Whetstone Creek and the Little Nottoway River before reaching the town of Crewe.  The state highway crosses over Norfolk Southern Railway's Norfolk District just east of a rail yard.  SR 49 turns northwest onto Virginia Avenue, where the highway joins US 460 in a concurrency.  The two highways become West Virginia Avenue outside of the downtown area and parallel the rail yard to the west end of town, where SR 49 turns north onto Watsons Wood Road.  SR 49 crosses Deep Creek before reaching its northern terminus at US 360 (Patrick Henry Highway) northeast of Burkeville.

History
Prior to 1940, SR 49 continued west from Virgilina to US 501 and north from Burkeville all the way to Flint Hill.  Most of SR 49 north of Burkeville became US 522 in the 1940 renumbering.

Major intersections

SR 49 Truck

Virginia State Truck Route 49 in Victoria, Virginia starts out overlapped with Virginia State Route 40 Truck, following Tidewater Avenue from Court Street to West 6th Street, Railroad Avenue from Tidewater Avenue and West 6th Street to Main Street, and First Avenue. From there it turns north onto Main Street in another overlap, this time with Virginia State Route 40, and terminates at the east end of the VA 40/49 overlap.

References

External links

Virginia Highways Project: VA 49

049
State Route 049
State Route 049
State Route 049
State Route 049